EL Kansera is an irrigation storage dam in Morocco.

Location
El Kansera is the oldest irrigation storage dam in Morocco.
The dam impounds the Oued Beht (or Beth), the last major tributary of the Sebou River before its mouth. 

The site of the dam was a deep, narrow gorge that the Beth had cut through the limestone bordering on the lowlands. 
Winter floods of the Beth had created large merdjas on the Sebou's left bank, which would be ideal for cultivation once irrigation water was available.

Construction
At first the colonial agriculture and public works administrations opposed construction of this and other dams, 
but the main settlers, led by Gaston Lebault, pushed the project forward.
When governor-general Théodore Steeg arrived in 1925, known as the "water governor", the pace accelerated.
El Kansera was built between 1927 and 1935.
In 1928 Steeg's administration created a new colonization zone ("perimeter") located between Petitjean and Sidi Slimane.
The land was taken from the Cherardas, who were moved to less productive areas. The new perimeter was sited where water from the dam could be used in irrigation.

The main construction work was undertaken between 1931 and 1934. 
The dam was built by Société Générale d'Enterprises, a French company.
François de Pierrefeu was the prime contractor.
Henri Prost (1874-1959) was the architect for the power station, which was completed in 1934.
It would control flooding of the Beht and irrigate  of fertile land in the Rharb plain. 
The hydroelectric plant at the base would generate 13 million KWh annually. 
The concrete structure was built on calcareous marl, which caused great difficulty in construction.

Later development
The government did not plan ahead for the way the irrigation water would be used. 
World War II (1939-1945) caused further delays in development. 
As of 1953 only  of land was in fact being irrigated since the distribution system was still incomplete.
This lack of planning is a serious problem in a region where silting imposes a finite lifespan on any storage dam.
The irrigated region was almost entirely in the hands of the colonists.
By 1969  were being irrigated.
 
The job was complicated by the difficulty of conducting deep excavation near the foundation and problems with making the new concrete bond to the old.
The design included addition of 77 steel cables under a tension of 240 tonnes each.  Soon after completion,  in February 1969 it withstood a major flood and a simultaneous earthquake.

See also

 List of power stations in Morocco

References
Citations

Sources

Dams completed in 1935
Energy infrastructure completed in 1946
Dams in Morocco
Hydroelectric power stations in Morocco
20th-century architecture in Morocco